Coca-Cola Europacific Partners plc (CCEP), formerly Coca-Cola European Partners (2016–2021) is a British  company formed as a result of the combination of the three main bottling companies for The Coca-Cola Company in Western Europe: Coca-Cola Enterprises, Coca-Cola Iberian Partners, S.A. and Coca-Cola Erfrischungsgetränke AG, and one bottling company in Asia-Pacific: Coca-Cola Amatil. The multinational bottling company involved in the marketing, production, and distribution of Coca-Cola products and other drinks such as Capri-Sun, Monster and Relentless.

Overview 
Coca-Cola Europacific Partners was formed on 10 May 2021 by Coca-Cola European Partners' acquisition of Australian bottling company Coca-Cola Amatil. The new company maintained the CCEP stock tickers that its predecessor had used.

Coca-Cola European Partners was formed on 28 May 2016 as a result of the combination of the three main bottling companies for The Coca-Cola Company in Western Europe: Coca-Cola Enterprises, Coca-Cola Iberian Partners, S.A. and Coca-Cola Erfrischungsgetränke AG. The combination created the world’s largest independent Coca-Cola bottler based on net revenues and was estimated to result in a savings of between $350 million and $375 million within three years of closing.

The merger was similar to that of Coca-Cola Beverages Africa, which consolidated Coca-Cola bottling operations in East and Southern Africa.

The company, with shares being traded in euros, has been listed on the London Stock Exchange since March 2019.

See also
 Anchor bottler
 Coca-Cola Beverages Africa
Coca-Cola Amatil

References

Coca-Cola
Coca-Cola bottlers
Multinational food companies
Food and drink companies established in 2016
2016 establishments in Europe
Companies listed on the London Stock Exchange
Companies listed on the Madrid Stock Exchange
Companies listed on Euronext Amsterdam
Companies listed on the Nasdaq
Drink companies of the United Kingdom
Companies based in the London Borough of Hillingdon
Uxbridge